Fenians Johnstown is an Irish Gaelic Athletic Association club in County Kilkenny, Ireland. Hurling is the dominant sport in the club, which has provided the Kilkenny intercounty team with several top players. The club has also found success at county, provincial and even All-Ireland level.

Honours

All-Ireland Senior Club Hurling Championships: 0
 1974 (runner up)
Leinster Senior Club Hurling Championships: 1
 1974
Kilkenny Senior Hurling Championships: 5
 1970, 1972, 1973, 1974, 1977
 Kilkenny Junior Hurling Championships: 1
 1968
 Kilkenny Minor Hurling Championships: 3
 1942, 1943, 1988

Notable hurlers

Pat Henderson
Pat Delaney
Nicky Orr
Ger Henderson
John Henderson
Billy Fitzpatrick
J.J. Delaney
P.J. Ryan

External links
 Official Fenians Johnstown GAA Club website
 Information about Fenains on the KilkennyCats website

Gaelic games clubs in County Kilkenny
Hurling clubs in County Kilkenny